White Plains Road is a major north-south thoroughfare which runs the length of the New York City borough of the Bronx. It runs from Castle Hill and Clason Point in the south to Wakefield in the north, where it crosses the city line and becomes West 1st Street of Mount Vernon, New York.  The Bronx River Parkway lies to its west and parallels much of its route. Between Magenta Street & 217th Street, White Plains Road is very wide due to the presence of the Gun Hill Road station house in the road's median.  

Historically, the route ran through an alignment through Mount Vernon by way of modern First Street, Lincoln Avenue (and Clinton Street), where it continued along modern North Columbus Ave.  The route further continued with the current alignment Hussey Road across the Cross County Parkway, merging again with current North Columbus Avenue (modern NY 22-Columbus Avenue was known as "Central Blvd" into the 1960s between current Hussey Road and the Cross County Parkway, as the rebuilding of the parkway severed the old alignment of NY 22).  These roads acquired their modern names around the end of the 19th century.  Today at the Bronxville Village line, White Plains Road continues as New York State Route 22 (NY 22), to Broadway in White Plains where it terminates as Post Road.

Transportation

North of Birchall Avenue in Van Nest, White Plains Road runs below the IRT White Plains Road Line of the New York City Subway, to that line's terminus, Wakefield–241st Street station.

The Bx22 serves White Plains Road between Unionport Road and Bronx Park East while the Bx36 serves White Plains Road between Lafayette Avenue and  East 177th Street / Cross Bronx Expressway while the Bx39 serves the entire road south of 241st Street.

References 

Streets in the Bronx